Blagoy Stefanov Shklifov (January 30, 1935 – September 25, 2003) was a Bulgarian dialectologist and phonologist.

Shklifov was born in Polykeraso (Chereshnitsa), Vitsi municipality, Kastoria regional unit, Greece in 1935.

In 1948, at the end of the Greek Civil War, he left his burned village and after a short stay in Socialist Republic of Macedonia went to Hungary, with many refugees from Greek Macedonia. In 1964, he went to Bulgaria and studied at Sofia University "St. Clement of Ohrid". He was a lecturer at the University of Szeged, Hungary and at Sofia University, Bulgaria.

In his books, he claimed that the Slavophones of Greek Macedonia are  Bulgarians. For this reason, he was not permitted to enter Greece for 40 years. He died in September 2003 in a car crash during a field work trip in Greece. Some of his colleagues suspect he was murdered.

Work 
Shklifov specialised on Bulgarian dialectology, especially the phonetics of South-West Bulgarian (Macedonian) dialects and their connection with Old Bulgarian. Considering these dialects in comparative plan with Old Bulgarian he explained the development of many sounds, for example ѫ, not with external influences, but with internal processes in the language.

Shklifov regarded the western Slavic dialects of Greece as a part of the Bulgarian dialect area.

References

External links
Shkifov, Blagoy and Ekaterina Shklifova. Bulgarian dialect texts from Aegean Macedonia, Sofia 2003, Published by Bulgarian Academy of Sciences (in Bulgarian)
Kostur and prof. Blagoj Shklifov, in Bulgarian
Bulgarian scientist killed in Greece?, in Bulgarian

1935 births
2003 deaths
Linguists from Bulgaria
Bulgarian expatriates in Hungary
Bulgarians from Aegean Macedonia
Dialectologists
Bulgarian educators
Road incident deaths in Greece
Child refugees
People from Kastoria (regional unit)
20th-century linguists
20th-century Bulgarian people